The 1836 United States presidential election in Mississippi took place between November 3 and December 7, 1836, as part of the 1836 United States presidential election. Voters chose four representatives, or electors to the Electoral College, who voted for President and Vice President.

Mississippi voted for the Democratic candidate, Martin Van Buren, over Whig candidate Hugh White. Van Buren won Mississippi by a margin of 2.56%.

Results

References

Mississippi
1836
1836 Mississippi elections